Fort Wright was constructed in 1861 and located on the second Chickasaw Bluff at Randolph, Tipton County, Tennessee. Fort Wright was a Civil War fortification and the first military training facility of the Confederate Army in Tennessee.

History
On January 20, 1861 the Memphis Appeal published a pro-secessionist proposal to build a fort at Randolph to defend Memphis from invaders. In a communiqué sent to LeRoy P. Walker, the first Confederate States Secretary of War, Brigadier General Gideon J. Pillow endorsed Randolph on April 26, 1861 as "the most eligible situation for a battery to protect Memphis". Within a few days, in late April of that same year, Tennessee Governor Isham G. Harris ordered Lieutenant Colonel Marcus Joseph Wright to establish a camp at Randolph and complete the fortification. About 5,000 troops from Tennessee, Arkansas and the Confederate Army were stationed at the location to accomplish the task. It took four months to fortify the bluff at Randolph with earthen defenses and artillery batteries in order to protect the fort from land and naval attacks.

By June 1861, the construction of the fortification was not yet completely finished. However, 50 cannons were reported to be ready at Fort Wright by that time, "mostly thirty-two pounders; the rest larger, 42s and 64s. Thirty-two of them are mounted". The Memphis Bulletin published a status report of Fort Wright after a visit at the fortification on June 22, 1861. By that time, the "earthen breastworks have been sodded with grass" and were reported "twenty to thirty feet in thickness" (6–10 m). Only one "narrow defile on the landward side" was reported by the Bulletin which was "defended by heavy guns" and "crossed by an earthen wall thirty to forty feet in thickness" (10–12 m). A "crescent shaped wall"  to the east of the fortification provided a defense from land attacks. Fort Randolph, a second Confederate stronghold in the area, was constructed only months after Fort Wright, in Fall 1861.

Nathan Bedford Forrest (1821–77) and Alexander P. Stewart (1821–1908) trained at Fort Wright. Stewart was promoted to the rank of Major in the "Tennessee Militia" by Governor Harris and was assigned "command of the heavy artillery and water batteries (...) at Fort Wright" shortly after his own training there was completed. Stewart "organized and trained 20 batteries of Tennessee artillery" at Fort Wright at Randolph. Both Forrest and Stewart would later become important figures in the rank of Lieutenant General in the Confederate Army during the Civil War. Other future leaders in the Army of Tennessee and Forrest's cavalry received training at Fort Wright.

Fort Wright was Tennessee's first military training camp in which soldiers could gain experience in the construction of fortifications and the setup of artillery batteries to counter naval attacks. They could undertake defense drills and acquire general military skills and discipline. Soldiers who were trained at Fort Wright fought in battles on different battlefields later in the war, the Battle of Shiloh, the Battle of Belmont, the Battle of Murfreesboro, the Battle of Chickamauga, the Battle of Franklin and the Battle of Bentonville. The Confederate stronghold at Fort Wright was the forwardmost defensive position on the Mississippi River until July 1861, it was abandoned by the Confederate infantry by 1862 but sporadically occupied by other southern forces during the Civil War.

In 2008, only a powder magazine is left of Fort Wright.

Location
Fort Wright (historical) was at coordinates .

See also

History of Randolph, Tennessee
Nathan Bedford Forrest
Fort Randolph (Tennessee)
List of forts in Tennessee
Location of Fort Randolph and Fort Wright

References

Wright
Wright
Randolph, Tennessee
Buildings and structures in Tipton County, Tennessee
Tennessee in the American Civil War
1861 establishments in Tennessee